The men's 200 metre butterfly event at the 2000 Summer Olympics took place on 18–19 September at the Sydney International Aquatic Centre in Sydney, Australia.

U.S. swimmer Tom Malchow shattered his own Olympic record to claim a gold medal in the event. Coming from third place on the final turn, he held off a challenge from fast-pacing Denys Sylantyev of Ukraine to touch the wall first in 1:55.35. Sylantyev trailed behind by almost half a second (0.50) to take a silver in 1:55.76, while Australia's Justin Norris settled for the bronze in an Oceanian record of 1:56.17.

Russia's Anatoly Polyakov finished outside the medals in 1:56.34. 15-year-old Michael Phelps, the youngest male U.S. Olympic swimmer in 68 years, continued to improve his personal best of 1:56.50, but it was only enough to pull off a fifth-place finish.

Phelps, who later emerged as the most-decorated Olympian of all-time, was followed in the sixth spot by Great Britain's Stephen Parry in 1:57.01. Defending Olympic champion Denis Pankratov seized a powerful lead on the first length, but faded shortly to seventh place in 1:57.97. France's Franck Esposito (1:58.39), bronze medalist in Barcelona eight years earlier, closed out the field.

Earlier, Malchow posted a top-seeded time of 1:56.25 on the morning prelims to cut off Melvin Stewart's 1992 Olympic record by a hundredth of a second (0.01). Followed by an evening session on day three, he eventually lowered it to 1:56.02 in the semifinals.

Records
Prior to this competition, the existing world and Olympic records were as follows.

The following new world and Olympic records were set during this competition.

Results

Heats

Semifinals

Semifinal 1

Semifinal 2

Final

References

External links
Official Olympic Report

B
Men's events at the 2000 Summer Olympics